José Clébson de Lima (born September 4, 1985), known as Clébson, is a Brazilian professional footballer who  and plays as an attacking midfielder for Brazilian club Juazeirense.

Club career
Clébson started his career playing with Porto. He made his professional debut during the 2004 season.

References

External links
Clébson at ZeroZero

1985 births
Living people
Sportspeople from Pernambuco
Brazilian footballers
Association football midfielders
Clube Atlético do Porto players
Como 1907 players
Central Sport Club players
Treze Futebol Clube players
Associação Desportiva Recreativa e Cultural Icasa players
Associação Desportiva Cabense players
Ferroviário Atlético Clube (CE) players
Salgueiro Atlético Clube players
Clube do Remo players
Boa Esporte Clube players
Clube Atlético Linense players
América Futebol Clube (RN) players
Esporte Clube São Bento players
Oeste Futebol Clube players
Grêmio Esportivo Brasil players
Figueirense FC players
Brusque Futebol Clube players
Associação Atlética Caldense players
Guarani Esporte Clube (MG) players
Anápolis Futebol Clube players
Sociedade Desportiva Juazeirense players
Campeonato Brasileiro Série B players
Campeonato Brasileiro Série C players
Campeonato Brasileiro Série D players